Rough Edge is an unincorporated community in Pontotoc County, Mississippi.

Rough Edge is mentioned in A Piece of My Heart, a novel by Mississippi writer Richard Ford.

References

Unincorporated communities in Pontotoc County, Mississippi
Unincorporated communities in Mississippi